Tipulamima sexualis is a moth of the family Sesiidae. It is known from Benin, Malawi and Nigeria.

The larvae feed on Ipomoea species.

References

Sesiidae
Moths of Africa
Moths described in 1910